Evan Lewis House is a historic home located in West Whiteland Township, Chester County, Pennsylvania. It was built about 1717, and was originally a single-pile, hall-and-parlor dwelling. It has been expanded and modified over the years, including absorption of former outbuildings into the structure of the house.  It is a -story, stuccoed stone structure.  Also on the property is a contributing stone bank barn (1821), built on the foundations of an earlier barn.

It was listed on the National Register of Historic Places in 1984.

References

Houses on the National Register of Historic Places in Pennsylvania
Houses completed in 1717
Houses in Chester County, Pennsylvania
National Register of Historic Places in Chester County, Pennsylvania
1717 establishments in Pennsylvania